Roinestad is a small part of Kvinesdal, Norway.  As typical in Norwegian tradition, persons who inhabited that area known as "Roinestad" in Kvinesdal adopted the name as their family (last) name.  While Roinestad (sometimes spelled "Roynestad") is not a common name, there are many Norwegian and United States residents that with this name.  Most notably Brooklyn, New York has a relatively high concentration of Roinestads who migrated from Kvinesdal at various times.

Norwegian-language surnames